Hendryk Lau (born 5 September 1969) is a German former professional footballer who played as a striker.

References

External links
 
 

1969 births
Living people
People from East Berlin
Footballers from Berlin
German footballers
Association football forwards
SV Meppen players
SV Babelsberg 03 players
Dresdner SC players
Berliner FC Dynamo players
2. Bundesliga players
East German footballers